Casey Kreiter (born August 13, 1990) is an American football long snapper for the New York Giants of the National Football League (NFL). He played college football at Iowa.

Early years
Kreiter attended Central High School. He played as a linebacker and tight end. As a junior, he received All-conference and second-team All-state honors. As a senior, he set the Iowa prep state record for points in a game, while receiving All-conference and All-state honors.

He also competed in wrestling, track and baseball. He received All-conference honors in wrestling as a senior.

College career
Kreiter accepted a football scholarship from the University of Iowa. As a redshirt freshman, he only played in the 27-24 loss against the University of Minnesota, handling long snaps in fourth quarter.

As a sophomore, he became the team's long snapper, while receiving Academic All-Big Ten honors. As a junior, he was the team's long snapper and posted 7 special teams tackles, while receiving Academic All-Big Ten honors. 

As a senior, he was the team's long snapper and the backup center behind James Ferentz, while receiving honorable-mention All-Big Ten and Academic All-Big Ten honors.

Professional career

Dallas Cowboys
Kreiter was signed as an undrafted free agent by the Dallas Cowboys after the 2014 NFL Draft on May 12. He was waived on August 26.

On March 18, 2015, he was re-signed by the Dallas Cowboys. He was released on August 31, after not being able to pass on the depth chart stalwart long snapper L.P. Ladouceur.

Denver Broncos
On April 7, 2016, Kreiter signed as a free agent with the Denver Broncos, to compete for the long snapper position after Aaron Brewer left in free agency. He won the starting job in July. He played in 10 games, before suffering a season-ending calf injury during a practice. On December 16, 2016, he was placed on the injured reserve list. He was replaced with Thomas Gafford.

On April 3, 2017 he was re-signed and was able to regain the long snapper job. On April 6, 2018, he was re-signed. He was selected to his first Pro Bowl, after making 146 snaps without an error. On March 7, 2019, he re-signed with the Broncos.

New York Giants
On April 1, 2020, Kreiter signed as a free agent with the New York Giants, to compete against Zak DeOssie. He reunited with offensive coordinator Jason Garrett, who was the head coach of the Dallas Cowboys when he tried out for the team. He earned the long snapper job during preseason and DeOssie opted to retire on August 7. He was placed on the reserve/COVID-19 list by the team on November 18, 2020, and activated on November 23.

On March 17, 2021, Kreiter re-signed with the Giants. On March 16, 2022, Kreiter re-signed with the Giants.

References

External links 
 Iowa Hawkeyes bio
 Denver Broncos bio

1990 births
Living people
American football long snappers
Dallas Cowboys players
Denver Broncos players
Iowa Hawkeyes football players
New York Giants players
People from DeWitt, Iowa
Players of American football from Iowa
American Conference Pro Bowl players